George Harris may refer to:

Arts and entertainment
George Harris (barrister) (1809–1890), English writer
George Washington Harris (1814–1869), American writer and humorist
George Frederick Harris (painter) (1856–1924), Welsh portrait and landscape painter
George Albert Harris (1913–1991), American painter, muralist, and lithographer
George Harris (actor) (born 1949), British film, television, and stage actor
Hibiscus (entertainer) (George Harris, Jr., 1949–1982), American war protester, then actor
George Harris, a character in Uncle Tom's Cabin

Military
George Harris, 1st Baron Harris (1746–1829), British general
George W. Harris (1835–1920s), American Civil War soldier and Medal of Honor recipient

Politics
George Harris, 3rd Baron Harris (1810–1872), Governor of Trinidad
George E. Harris (1827–1911), United States Representative from Mississippi
George Harris (Queensland politician) (1831–1891), Member of the Queensland Legislative Council, Australia
George Harris, 4th Baron Harris (1851–1932), English cricketer and politician
George Chesley Harris (1879–1954), merchant and politician in Newfoundland

Religion
George Harris (Unitarian) (1794–1859), English Unitarian minister in Scotland
George Harris (theologian) (1844–1922), American theologian and academic administrator
George Clinton Harris (1925–2000), bishop of the Episcopal Diocese of Alaska

Science and medicine
George Prideaux Robert Harris (1775–1810), Australian naturalist
George Harris (physician) (1856–1931), Inspector General of Civil Hospitals in the Punjab, United Provinces and Bengal
George Frederick Harris (geologist) (1862–1906), English palaeontologist

Sports

Association football
George Harris (footballer, born 1875) (1875–1910), English-born footballer for Aston Villa, Wolves and Grimsby Town
George Harris (footballer, born 1877) (1877–?), English-born footballer for Stoke and Southampton
George Harris (footballer, born 1878) (1878–1923), English footballer for Aston Villa and West Bromwich Albion
George Harris (footballer, born 1940) (1940–2022), English-born footballer for Watford and Reading
George Harris (soccer) (born 1948), Australian former football (soccer) player

Cricket
George Harris, 4th Baron Harris (1851–1932), English cricketer and politician
George Harris (cricketer, born 1880) (1880–1954), English cricketer
George Harris (cricketer, born 1904) (1904–1988), English cricketer
George Harris (cricketer, born 1906) (1906–1994), English cricketer

Other sports
George Harris (Australian footballer) (1902–1981), Australian rules footballer
George Harris (Carlton president) (1922–2007), Australian football club president
George Harris (wrestler) (1927–2002), American wrestler and wrestling manager
George Harris (judoka) (1933–2011), American judoka
Duke Harris (George Francis Harris, 1942–2017), Canadian ice hockey player
George Harris (baseball), American baseball player
Lloyd Harris (tennis) (Lloyd George Harris, born 1997), South African tennis player

Others
George P. Harris (c. 1820–1873), co-founder of Australian retailer Harris Scarfe
George Delancey Harris (1892–1958), American business executive
George Bernard Harris (1901–1983), United States federal judge